Airport Drive is a 5.7 kilometre highway in Melbourne, Australia, linking Centre Road at Melbourne Airport with the M80 Ring Road at Airport West. This road is an important thoroughfare for the adjacent Melbourne Airport Business Park along South Centre Road, and acts as an alternative access road to Tullamarine Freeway.

Route
Airport Drive starts at the intersection of Grants and Centre Road at Melbourne Airport, just south of Terminal 4, running east as a four-lane, dual-carriageway road past the Long Term Parking lot, turning south-east past more car parks and Airport service companies, before turning south along a wide alignment (to incorporate a future railway link to the airport) to the intersection with Sharps Road, then through the Tullamarine Park industrial area to terminate at the Western Ring Road; Westfield Drive continues past the interchange over the Albion–Jacana railway line to link to the Westfield Airport West shopping centre just under a kilometre away.

History
Airport Drive originally opened to traffic between Sharps Road and the Western Ring Road in May 1997.

The passing of the Road Management Act 2004 granted the responsibility of overall management and development of Victoria's major arterial roads to VicRoads: in 2004, VicRoads declared Airport Connection Road (Freeway #1280) from Western Ring Road in Tullamarine to Sharps Road in Tullamarine; the declaration formally makes this section a freeway; signposts along this section have also kept their original name.

In July 2013, construction began on an extension from Sharps Road to the intersection of Melrose Drive and Mercer Drive, Melbourne Airport. Airport Drive Extension opened to traffic on 28 June 2015, at a cost of $100 million, with the existing Melrose Drive roadway between Mercer Drive and Centre Road subsumed into Airport Drive. As part of the extension project, Link Road was realigned to form a new traffic-light intersection at Airport Drive, with through traffic connecting to Watson Drive and Melrose Drive. The extension is not part of VicRoads' freeway declaration and presently remains undeclared.

Intersections

See also

References

Highways and freeways in Melbourne
Transport in the City of Hume
Transport in the City of Moonee Valley